Deh Kalbali (also Romanized as Deh Kalb‘alī and Deh-e Kalb ‘Alī; also known as Kalb ‘Alī) is a village in Kabutarsorkh Rural District, in the Central District of Chadegan County, Isfahan Province, Iran. At the 2006 census, its population was 275, in 93 families.

References 

Populated places in Chadegan County